Coblentz is a small lunar impact crater that is located on the far side of the Moon, to the south of the much larger crater Bolyai. This crater retains a circular rim, but it has been worn by impact erosion. This is particularly so at the southern end where an irregular gap exists in the rim. The interior floor is relatively featureless save for several tiny craterlets.

A ridge arcs from the northwest rim of Coblentz to join the southern rim of Bolyai. There are several patches of dark (low albedo) material just to the south and southwest of Coblentz.

References 

 
 
 
 
 
 
 
 
 
 
 
 

Impact craters on the Moon